The Gove Australian Football League is an Australian rules football league based on the Gove Peninsula in the Northern Territory.

Current Clubs
Baywarra Football Club
Djarrak Football Club
Gopu Football Club
Nguykal Football Club
Datjala Football Club
Groote Football Club
Nhulunbuy Saints Football Club

Premiers

1974 NO FINALS PLAYED
1975 DJARRAK FC
1976 CATS FC
1977 SOUTH ARNHEM FC
1978 CATS FC
1979 CATS FC
1980 DJARRAK FC
1981 DJARRAK FC
1982 SOUTH ARNHEM FC
1983 CATS FC
1984 CATS FC
1985 SOUTH ARNHEM FC
1986 CATS FC
1987 WALKABOUT FC
1988 CATS FC
1989 WALKABOUT FC
1990 GOPU FC
1991 WALKABOUT FC
1992 WALKABOUT FC
1993 CATS FC
1994 GOPU FC
1995 GOPU FC
1996 GOPU FC
1997 GALUPU FC
1998 GOPU FC
1999 NHULUNBUY FC
2000 DJARRAK FC
2001 GOPU FC
2002 GOPU FC
2003 NGUYKAL FC
2004 SAINTS FC
2005 SAINTS FC
2006 SAINTS FC
2007 BAYWARA FC
2008 GOPU FC
2009 DJARRAK FC
2010 GOPU FC
2011 GOPU FC
2012 GOPU FC
2013 NGUYKAL FC
2014 NGUYKAL FC
2015 DJARRAK FC
2016 NGUYKAL FC
2017 DJARRAK FC
2018 NGUYKAL FC
2019 NGUYKAL FC
2020 GOPU FC
2021 NGUYKAL FC

See also
AFL Northern Territory
Northern Territory Football League
Australian rules football in the Northern Territory

References

External links
 

Australian rules football competitions in the Northern Territory
Arnhem Land